A route server is a computer server that was originally developed by the Routing Arbiter project, with funding from the National Science Foundation. This routing process directs information among Border Gateway Protocol (BGP) routers. These servers are placed at Network access points (NAPs), where centralized computers organize and match routing data. Route servers are important because they help manage BGP sessions. BGP sessions have difficulties with overhead when managing sessions where routers with single and multiple domains are connected (also known as full mesh routing connectivity). Route servers reduce overhead by referencing the IP routing table of an autonomous system where the server is located.

Further reading

External links 
 
 
 
 

Internet governance
Internet Standards